Jiří Mikšík (born 2 January 1952) is a Czech former cyclist. He competed in the team pursuit event at the 1972 Summer Olympics.

References

External links
 

1952 births
Living people
Czech male cyclists
Olympic cyclists of Czechoslovakia
Cyclists at the 1972 Summer Olympics
Sportspeople from Brno